This is intended to be a complete list of properties and districts listed on the National Register of Historic Places in Galveston County, Texas. There are 10 districts, 70 individual properties, and four former properties listed on the National Register in the county. Two districts and one individually listed property are National Historic Landmarks. One district and six individually listed properties are State Antiquities Landmarks. Seventy-two properties are Recorded Texas Historic Landmarks including one property that contains two while four districts contain many more.

Many of the below locations survived the Galveston hurricane of 1900 while all former listings were victims of later hurricanes.

Current listings

The publicly disclosed locations of National Register properties and districts may be seen in a mapping service provided.

|}

Former listings
Four sites have been removed from the Register in Galveston County, three of which are due to being destroyed by Hurricane Ike in 2008.

|}

See also

National Register of Historic Places listings in Texas
Recorded Texas Historic Landmarks in Galveston County

References

External links

Registered Historic Places
 
Galveston